Charles Wolseley may refer to:

 Sir Charles Wolseley, 2nd Baronet (1630–1714), English politician 
 Sir Charles Wolseley, 7th Baronet (1769–1846)